Alloeomorphus formosus is a species of beetle in the family Cerambycidae, the only species in the genus Alloeomorphus.

References

Acanthocinini